Nové Město pod Smrkem is a town in Liberec District in the Liberec Region of the Czech Republic. It has about 3,700 inhabitants.

Administrative parts
Villages Hajniště and Ludvíkov pod Smrkem are administrative parts of Nové Město pod Smrkem.

Etymology
The name literally means "New Town under Smrk".

Geography
The northern part of the municipal territory lies in the Frýdlant Hills, the southern part extends into the Jizera Mountains. The highest point is located on the slopes of Smrk, which peak is just outside the municipal territory. The built-up area is situated in the valley of the stream Lomnice.

History
Nové Město pod Smrkem was founded in 1584 by Melchior of Redern and called Nové České Město (literally "New Bohemian Town"). There were discovered iron ore and tin veins. In 1592 it received town privileges. From 1901, the town has its current name. Since 1945, only the Czech name is used.

In 1938, the town was annexed by Nazi Germany and administered as a part of Reichsgau Sudetenland. After World War II, the German-speaking population was expelled.

Demographics

Notable people
Vincenz Hasak (1812–1889), German Catholic historian
Alfred Baeumler (1887–1968), German philosopher

Twin towns – sister cities

Nové Město pod Smrkem is twinned with:
 Leśna, Poland
 Mirsk, Poland
 Świeradów-Zdrój, Poland

References

External links

 

Cities and towns in the Czech Republic